Boreocingula globulus is a species of minute sea snail, a marine gastropod mollusk or micromollusk in the family Rissoidae.

Distribution

Description 
The maximum recorded shell length is 3.5 mm.

Habitat 
Minimum recorded depth is 10 m. Maximum recorded depth is 450 m.

References

Rissoidae
Gastropods described in 1842